Ludwig Schüler (6 January 1836 – 31 March 1930) was a German politician and from 17 September 1884 until 20 May 1907 mayor of Marburg.
In January 1911 he was appointed honorary citizen.

References 

1836 births
1930 deaths
Politicians from Kassel
University of Marburg alumni
Mayors of Marburg